"Eyes on Me" is a pop ballad performed by Hong Kong singer Faye Wong as a love theme for the video game Final Fantasy VIII. The music was composed by Nobuo Uematsu with English lyrics by Kako Someya.

Single
The song was released as a CD single in Japan on February 24, 1999. The B-side was a ballad, "Red Beans", composed by Jim Lau with Mandarin lyrics by Lin Xi. It had been included in Faye Wong's 1998 album Sing and Play, along with a Cantonese version "Repayment", and was popular in its own right.

Upon the song's release in Japan, it placed number one on the Western music charts for 19 consecutive weeks, and generated lifetime sales of over 500,000 copies, as well, the song charted in the US on the Billboard Hot 100, debuted at 88 and peaked at 67 staying on the chart for 2 weeks. placing it as the best-selling video game music disc ever released in Japan until the release of "Hikari" by Utada Hikaru for Kingdom Hearts. In 2000, it was the first song in video game history to win an award at the 14th Annual Japan Gold Disc Awards, where it won "Song of the Year (Western Music)".

The song was popular among the video game community in the Western world, and brought Faye Wong to the attention of many who were not previously familiar with her music. In 2017, Brian Ashcraft from Kotaku described "Eyes on Me" as one of the most iconic songs of the Final Fantasy franchise, as well as one of the most commercially successful singles associated with the video game industry.

"Eyes on Me" was re-released on a 18cm vinyl record on November 3, 2017.

Theme song in the game
Near the end of the production of Final Fantasy VII, the developers suggested to use a singer, but abandoned the idea due to a lack of reasoning based on the game's theme and storyline. However, Nobuo Uematsu thought a ballad would closely relate to the theme and characters of Final Fantasy VIII. This resulted in the game's developers sharing "countless" artists, eventually deciding on Faye Wong, a Chinese vocalist. Uematsu claims "her voice and mood seem to match my image of the song exactly", and that her ethnicity "fits the international image of Final Fantasy". After negotiations were made, "Eyes on Me" was recorded in Hong Kong with an orchestra. IGN claimed that she was reportedly paid $1 million US dollars for her work.

The lyrics, written in imperfect English, unveil the hopes of a night club singer for romance with a member of her audience:
I kind of liked it your way   
How you shyly placed your eyes on me;   
Oh, did you ever know   That I had mine on you?Within Final Fantasy VIII, the song is written by Julia Heartilly, a pianist who is a love interest of Laguna Loire. It is heard repeatedly throughout the game in various incarnations as an instrumental piece, including a version entitled Julia. Its full version is heard during a pivotal moment between Squall Leonhart and Rinoa Heartilly—the main protagonists—on board the Ragnarok. It is played once more during the game's ending, with an orchestrated version playing in the credits of that game.

Other versions
A happy hardcore remix was recorded for the 2000 Dancemania compilation Speed 4, and on the Dancemania Speed Best 2001 of the Dancemania Speed series. There is another dance remix of the song made by Almighty, later included on the Japanese release of Wong's 2000 album Fable, Dancemania X5, and Dancemania Diamond Complete Edition (Millennium Hits Collection)

In 2004, a Japanese version sung by Manami Kiyota titled  with lyrics by Kazushige Nojima was included on Final Fantasy Song Book: Mahoroba.

The original song was also covered by Angela Aki for release on her 2006 single "Kokoro no Senshi", with minor grammatical changes. In an Excite Japan interview, Aki said that her version 'shed light on "Eyes on Me"'.

Covers by Kanon and Susan Calloway were also made; these singers also collaborated with Nobuo Uematsu on The Last Story and Final Fantasy XIV'' respectively.

The singer MayBee covered a Korean language version of the song.

Charts

Weekly charts

Year-end charts

Certifications

See also
 Music of Final Fantasy VIII

References

External links
 "Eyes on Me" lyrics at IGN
 Singable Chinese version at zompist.com (American linguist's site)

1999 singles
Faye Wong songs
Pop ballads
Final Fantasy music
Final Fantasy VIII
Video game theme songs
Angela Aki songs
English-language Japanese songs
1999 songs
Songs with music by Nobuo Uematsu
Love themes